A list of events relating to politics and government in the United Kingdom during 2023.

Events

January
 1 January – The Baroness Stedman-Scott steps down from the post of Parliamentary Under-Secretary of State for Work and Pensions.
 5 January – The UK government confirms it will not go ahead with a plan to privatise Channel 4.
 9 January – A new scheme to support businesses with the cost of energy bills is outlined in the House of Commons to replace existing support due to end in March. The scheme will replace capped energy bills with a wholesale discount on gas and electricity, and only apply when energy bills are high. Industries such as glass, ceramics and steel, which use a greater amount of energy, will get a larger discount than others.
 10 January – The UK government published the Strikes (Minimum Service Levels) Bill 2023, designed to require public sector organisations to provide a minimum service when their unions vote to strike.
 11 January – Andrew Bridgen, the MP for North West Leicestershire, is suspended from the Conservative Party for spreading misinformation about COVID-19 vaccines after posting a tweet comparing them to The Holocaust.
 12 January – Prime Minister Rishi Sunak and First Minister of Scotland Nicola Sturgeon hold talks at a hotel in Inverness.
 13 January – Former GB News presenter Mercy Muroki has been appointed by the UK government to advise Kemi Badenoch, the Minister for Women and Equalities, on gender policy.
 16 January –
 The UK government announces it will block the Gender Recognition Reform (Scotland) Bill amid concerns about its impact on UK-wide equality law.
 MPs vote 309–249 in favour of the Strikes (Minimum Service Levels) Bill, which now moves to the committee stage.
 19 January – Prime Minister Rishi Sunak apologises for taking his seat belt off in a moving car to film a social media clip. Lancashire Police later say they are "looking into" the incident. He is issued with a fixed-penalty notice the following day.
 22 January – Labour's chairwoman, Anneliese Dodds writes to Daniel Greenberg, the Parliamentary Commissioner for Standards, requesting "an urgent investigation" into claims that Richard Sharp, the Chairman of the BBC, helped former Prime Minister Boris Johnson secure a loan guarantee weeks before Johnson recommended him for the BBC chairmanship.
 23 January –
 William Shawcross, the Commissioner for Public Appointments, is to hold a review into the process of appointing Chairman of the BBC Richard Sharp following claims he helped then Prime Minister Boris Johnson secure a loan guarantee shortly before his appointment.
 Prime Minister Sunak orders his Independent Adviser on Ministers' Interests to investigate a disclosure that Conservative Party Chairman Nadhim Zahawi paid a £5m penalty to HM Revenue and Customs for unpaid taxes during his time as Chancellor of the Exchequer.
 26 January – GB News have hired Conservative MP and former Leader of the House of Commons Jacob Rees-Mogg as a presenter.
 28 January – Eric Pickles, chair of the Advisory Committee on Business Appointments, says that Nadine Dorries, the former Secretary of State for Culture, has breached the ministerial code by not consulting the watchdog about her appointment as a presenter on TalkTV, where she is to present a weekly show from 3 February.
 29 January – Nadhim Zahawi is dismissed as Chair of the Conservative Party after an inquiry finds he committed a "serious breach of the ministerial code" over his tax affairs.
 30 January –
 William Shawcross, the commissioner for public appointments, steps back from the planned investigation into how Richard Sharp got the job as BBC chairman because of previous contact between them. Another investigator will be appointed to take on the inquiry.
 MPs vote 315–246 in favour of the Strikes (Minimum Service Levels) Bill, which is then sent to the House of Lords for further debate.

February
 5 February – In a move seen as marking her return to political life, former Prime Minister Liz Truss writes an article for The Sunday Telegraph in which she says her economic agenda was never given a "realistic chance".
 7 February – Prime Minister Sunak performs a cabinet reshuffle. Greg Hands is named as the new Conservative Party chairman; Grant Shapps becomes the Secretary of State for Energy, Security and Net Zero in a newly-formed department; Kemi Badenoch is appointed as the first Secretary of State at the newly-created Department for Business and Trade, with continued responsibility as equalities minister.
 8 February
 Ukraine's President Volodymyr Zelensky addresses a joint session of Parliament during his first visit to the UK since Russia invaded his country. He later visits Buckingham Palace for a meeting with the King.
 Former Labour MP Jared O'Mara, who submitted fake expense claims to fund his cocaine habit, is convicted of fraud. He is sentenced the following day to four years in prison.
 9 February –
 The Independent Parliamentary Standards Authority confirms that MPs pay will increase by 2.9% from April 2023, taking their salary from £84,144 to £86,584.
 2023 West Lancashire by-election: Labour hold the seat with a 62.3% vote share, and an increase of 10.3%. Ashley Dalton is the new MP.
 Former Culture secretary Nadine Dorries announces she will step down as an MP at the next general election.
 In a radio interview before his appointment as Deputy Chairman of the Conservative Party, Lee Anderson said he would support the return of capital punishment where the perpetrators are clearly identifiable. Prime Minister Rishi Sunak said neither he nor the government shared Anderson's stance.
 13 February – Douglas Alexander, a minister in the governments of Tony Blair and Gordon Brown, who lost his seat in the 2015 general election, announces he will stand for parliament again at the next election as Labour's candidate for West Lothian.
 15 February –
 Nicola Sturgeon announces her resignation as First Minister of Scotland and Leader of the Scottish National Party after eight years in the role; she will stay on until her successor has been elected.
 Jeremy Corbyn will not stand as a Labour MP at the next general election, the party's leader, Sir Keir Starmer, confirms.
 16 February – Deputy First Minister of Scotland John Swinney  rules himself out of the SNP leadership contest.
 19 February –
 Former Prime Minister Boris Johnson urges present Prime Minister Rishi Sunak not to scrap the Northern Ireland Protocol Bill, warning to do so would be a "great mistake".
 Scottish Health Secretary Humza Yousaf and former Minister for Community Safety Ash Regan become the first two candidates to announce they will stand in the Scottish National Party leadership election. Keith Brown, the SNP's depute leader, Neil Gray, the Minister for International Development, and Màiri McAllan, the Environment Minister, all rule themselves out of the contest.
 In a speech to the Scottish Labour Party conference in Edinburgh, Labour leader Sir Keir Starmer rules out a deal with the SNP "under any circumstances", and warns against complacency following the departure of Nicola Sturgeon as SNP leader and First Minister.
 20 February – Scotland's Finance Secretary, Kate Forbes, announces she is running in the Scottish National Party leadership election.
 21 February –
 The UK Government announces that it had a budget surplus in January, with £5bn more in revenue than predicted.
 Kate Forbes insists her campaign to become the next SNP leader has not been derailed after she lost the support of several colleagues following comments about same-sex marriage and having children outside marriage, both of which she is opposed to as a member of the Free Church of Scotland.
 MSPs vote 68–57 to approve the Scottish Government's budget for the 2023–24 financial year, which includes a tax rise for everyone in Scotland earning more than £43,662.
 23 February –
 Labour leader Sir Keir Starmer outlines the five key issues that his party will focus on during the run up to the next general election: higher economic growth, clean energy, improving the NHS, reforming the justice system, and raising education standards.
 Environment Secretary Therese Coffey, commenting on the vegetable shortage, tells MPs "we anticipate the situation will last about another two to four weeks".
 24 February – Nominations close for the SNP leadership election, with Kate Forbes, Ash Regan and Humza Yousaf having all reached the threshold of supporters to go forward into the contest.
 25 February – Theo Clarke, the Conservative MP for Stafford, is deselected by her constituency party a week after returning to parliament from maternity leave.
 26 February –
 Luciana Berger, who left the Labour Party in 2019 following the antisemitism controversy, is to re-join the party after accepting an apology from Sir Keir Starmer, who said there had been a "litany of failures".  
 Betty Boothroyd, who became the first female Speaker of the House of Commons in 1992, dies at the age of 93.
 27 February – Sunak, and President of the European Commission, Ursula von der Leyen, announce a new Brexit deal for Northern Ireland, named the Windsor Framework.

March
 1 March – COVID-19 in the UK: WhatsApp messages leaked to the Daily Telegraph are reported as suggesting former Health Secretary Matt Hancock chose to ignore advise from experts in April 2020 that there should be "testing of all going into care homes". A spokesman for Hancock said "These stolen messages have been doctored to create a false story that Matt rejected clinical advice on care home testing”.
 2 March –
 COVID-19 in the UK: The Daily Telegraph publishes more of Matt Hancock's WhatsApp exchanges, this time with former Education Secretary Gavin Williamson in December 2020, when a debate into whether schools should reopen following the Christmas holiday was taking place. The leaked messages suggest Hancock favoured school closures, while Williamson was more hesitant. Hancock, who worked alongside journalist Isabel Oakeshott to co-author a book, describes the release of the messages as a "massive betrayal and breach of trust". In response, Oakeshott says she released the messages because she believed doing so was in the "public interest".
 Sir Keir Starmer unveils Sue Gray, who led the investigation into the Partygate scandal, as Labour's new Chief of Staff, sparking concern among some Conservative MPs about her impartiality. On the same day, Gray resigns from her post as Cabinet Office Second Permanent Secretary and leaves the Civil Service.
 Scotland's Minister for Transport, Jenny Gilruth, announces plans to nationalise the overnight Caledonian Sleeper train service that links London with several locations in Scotland, taking effect from 25 June. 
 3 March –
 The Commons Select Committee of Privileges finds that former Prime Minister Boris Johnson may have misled Parliament over the Partygate scandal after evidence suggested breaches of COVID-19 rules would have been "obvious" to him. In response Johnson says that none of the evidence shows he "knowingly" misled parliament, and that "it is clear from this report that I have not committed any contempt of parliament".
 The latest leaked WhatsApp messages published by the Daily Telegraph are reported as appearing to show former Health Secretary Matt Hancock and Cabinet Secretary Simon Case joking about locking people in quarantine hotels. 
 Rupa Huq is allowed to rejoin the Labour Party five months after being suspended over comments she made about former Conservative Chancellor Kwasi Kwarteng.
 Buckingham Palace announces the first state visit to be made by Charles III and Camilla as King and Queen Consort; they will travel to France and Germany between 26 and 31 March.
 4 March – Leaked WhatsApp messages published by the Daily Telegraph indicate Matt Hancock and his staff deliberated over whether or not he had broken COVID-19 regulations after pictures of him kissing his aide, Gina Coladangelo, were published by The Sun newspaper. In another conversation, the messages show Hancock criticising the Eat Out to Help Out scheme for "causing problems" in areas where there were a nigh number of COVID-19 cases.
 5 March –
 News outlets including BBC News, Sky News and The Independent (who have not verified the messages) report that further WhatsApp messages published by The Telegraph appear to show discussions about how and when the government should reveal details of the Kent COVID-19 variant in order to ensure people would comply with the regulations. The news outlets also says Hancock appears to suggest they should "frighten the pants off everyone", while in another conversation, head of the civil service Simon Case suggests the "fear/guilt factor" was an important element of the government's messaging. The Telegraph also reports messages showing ministers and civil servants discussing "[getting] heavy with the police" to enforce lockdown measures with senior police officers being brought into Number 10 to be told to be stricter with the public.
 Speaking to the Mail on Sunday, Sunak says that migrants arriving in the UK on small boats will be prevented from seeking asylum under proposed new legislation to be brought before Parliament.
 6 March – The Telegraph publishes messages that are reported to have been exchanged between Allan Nixon, a parliamentary Advisor and Hancock from November 2020 in which they discuss threatening to cancel projects in MPs constituencies if MPs do not support the local lockdown tiers legislation. It is also reported that as part of a strategy aimed at trying to stop MPs from rebelling against the legislation, party whips compiled a spreadsheet of 95 MPs who disagreed with this policy and the reasons for them disagreeing; these related to lack of parliamentary scrutiny, economic harm, harms to hospital, absence of cost benefit analysis and the policy being "unconservative".
 7 March –
 Home Secretary Suella Braverman introduces the Illegal Migration Bill into the House of Commons, which is designed to stop migrants arriving in the UK by boat. The legislation proposes to detain and remove those from the UK who arrive by illegal means, as well as blocking them from returning. 
 STV hosts the first televised debate of the Scottish National Party leadership election.
 9 March – The UK government announces a two-year delay in the construction of the Birmingham to Crewe leg of HS2 in order to save costs.
 10 March – The King bestows the title of Duke of Edinburgh on his younger brother, Prince Edward.
 13 March –
 Prime Minister Rishi Sunak announces an extra £5bn of government spending for UK defence over the coming two years.
 Voting opens in the Scottish National Party leadership election.
 14 March – BBC Scotland hosts the final televised debate of the SNP leadership election.
 15 March – Chancellor of the Exchequer Jeremy Hunt presents the 2023 budget to the House of Commons.
 16 March – The government announces that TikTok is to be banned on electronic devices used by ministers and other employees, amid security concerns relating to the Chinese-owned app's handling of user data.
 18 March – Peter Murrell resigns as chief executive of the Scottish National Party amid a row over party membership. Mike Russell succeeds him as interim chief executive.
 19 March – The UK government launches the Emergency Alerts service, a service to send text alerts to mobile phones in a situation where it is perceived there is an immediate risk to life.
 21 March – At 8pm, Times Radio airs a leadership debate from Edinburgh and featuring the three candidates in the Scottish National Party leadership election.
 27 March – The result of the 2023 Scottish National Party leadership election to replace Nicola Sturgeon is announced.

April

May
 4 May – The 2023 United Kingdom local elections are scheduled to take place.
 6 May – The Coronation of Charles III and Camilla is scheduled to take place at Westminster Abbey, London.
 18 May – The 2023 Northern Ireland local elections are scheduled to be held.

June

July

August

September

October

November

December

See also 
 2023 United Kingdom electoral calendar

References

2023 in British politics
Political timelines of the 2020s by year
2023 in the United Kingdom
Political timelines of the United Kingdom